Trifanovo is a rural locality (a village) in Ivanovskoye Rural Settlement, Vashkinsky District, Vologda Oblast, Russia. The population was 18 as of 2002.

Geography 
Trifanovo is located 53 km northeast of Lipin Bor (the district's administrative centre) by road. Larino is the nearest rural locality.

References 

Rural localities in Vashkinsky District